Simons Park is a municipal park located at 1640 N. Drake Avenue in the Humboldt Park community of West Side, Chicago, Illinois. 

It is administered by the Chicago Park District, and contains full facilities for activities including baseball, boxing, and outdoor basketball. It also contains a full gymnasium, meeting rooms, a children's playground and a spraypool (operated during the summer months).

History
The property currently occupied by Simons Park was originally farmland, owned and planted by early settlers Edward and Laura Sprague Simons. The original land was bordered by Armitage Avenue, North Avenue, Central Park Avenue and Kedzie Avenue.

In 1916, the Fullerton Avenue Business Men's Association proposed creating a public park to serve the neighborhood, however the plan was put on hold until after World War I was over. The Northwest Park District (consolidated into the new Chicago Park District in 1934), made a purchase of land in 1920 to establish the park, and within 8 years, a new fieldhouse had been constructed to finish the park. The fieldhouse was designed by Walter W. Ahlschlager. It was remodeled in 1990 and renovated in the early 2000s.

Simon City Royals
A 1950s Chicago greaser gang called Simon City originally took their name from the park, as it was the most prominent feature in their territory at the time. After merging with another gang, this gang would eventually become the infamous Simon City Royals street gang. As the neighborhood began to change, the Simon City Royals eventually left the area, leaving their territory behind.

References

Parks in Chicago
West Side, Chicago
1920 establishments in Illinois